Naugawan Sadat is one of the 403 constituencies of the Uttar Pradesh Legislative Assembly, India. It is a part of the Amroha City and one of the five assembly constituencies in the Amroha Lok Sabha constituency. The first election in this assembly constituency was held in 2012 after the "Delimitation of Parliamentary and Assembly Constituencies Order, 2008" was passed in the year 2008. The constituency is assigned identification number 40. Naugawan Sadat was founded by Maulana Fakhruddin

Wards/Areas
Extent of Naugawan Sadat Assembly constituency are KCs Naugawan Sadat, Kailsa & Naugawan Sadat NP of Amroha Tehsil; PCs Mubarakpur Kalan, Rajoha, Machra Bhagwanpur, Koovi, Karanpur Mafi, Sihali Jageer, Katai, Jeehal, Tanda, Tasiha, Chakori, Umarpur, Manauta, Gharont, Taharpur of Hasanpur KC of Hasanpur Tehsil.

Members of the Vidhan Sabha

Election results

2022

2020

2017

17th Vidhan Sabha: 2017 General Elections

16th Vidhan Sabha: 2012 General Elections.

See also
Amroha Lok Sabha constituency
Jyotiba Phule Nagar
Sixteenth Legislative Assembly of Uttar Pradesh
Uttar Pradesh Legislative Assembly

References

External links
 

Assembly constituencies of Uttar Pradesh
Amroha district
Constituencies established in 2008
2008 establishments in Uttar Pradesh